Suipinima is a genus of beetles in the family Cerambycidae, containing the following species:

 Suipinima marginalis Martins & Galileo, 2004
 Suipinima pitanga Martins & Galileo, 2004
 Suipinima suturalis Martins & Galileo, 2004
 Suipinima una Martins & Galileo, 2004

References

Aerenicini